St Mary's Church is a parish church in the Church of England in East Leake, Nottinghamshire.

The church is Grade I listed by the Department for Digital, Culture, Media and Sport as a building of outstanding architectural or historic interest.

History

The church dates from the Norman period but has substantial later medieval work. Until the fourteenth century, the church was dedicated to St Leonard, but the church was re-dedicated to St Mary who was more popular.

After the chancel collapsed in the nineteenth century, a major restoration was carried out in 1886 by W. S. Weatherley.

Stained glass

There are stained glass windows by Charles Eamer Kempe, James Powell and Sons and Heaton, Butler and Bayne.

Organ

The church has a pipe organ by Ingram built in 1914. The specification of the organ can be found on the National Pipe Organ Register.

In April 2021 a new organist, Richard Babington, was appointed.

Bells
The church has six bells.

Current parish status
The church runs regular Life Explored courses for anyone interested in exploring Christianity.

It is in a group of parishes which includes:
St Giles' Church, Costock
St Mary's Church, East Leake
All Saints' Church, Rempstone
St Helena's Church, West Leake
Church of St John the Baptist, Stanford on Soar

References

The Buildings of England, Nottinghamshire. Nikolaus Pevsner

Grade I listed churches in Nottinghamshire
Church of England church buildings in Nottinghamshire
Mary